Darren Hughes (born June 3, 1967) is a former American football player who played two seasons in the Arena Football League with the Memphis Pharaohs, Connecticut Coyotes, Charlotte Rage, Florida Bobcats and Los Angeles Avengers. He played college football at Carson–Newman University. He was also a member of the Ohio Glory and Toronto Argonauts.

References

External links
Just Sports Stats
Pro Football Archives

Living people
1967 births
Players of American football from California
Sportspeople from Los Angeles County, California
American football wide receivers
American football defensive backs
Canadian football defensive backs
American players of Canadian football
Carson–Newman Eagles football players
Ohio Glory players
Toronto Argonauts players
Memphis Pharaohs players
Connecticut Coyotes players
Charlotte Rage players
Florida Bobcats players
Los Angeles Avengers players
People from Lynwood, California